The Mewa Singh's night frog (Nyctibatrachus mewasinghi) is a species of frog in the family Nyctibatrachus. It is endemic to the Western Ghats.

Taxonomy 
The holotype was collected in the Malabar Wildlife Sanctuary in the Western Ghats.

The species is named after Dr. Mewa Singh, in honor of his contribution to the preservation of Indian primates.

Habitat and distribution 
The species is only known from the type locality. The specimens captured were seen along a stream with riparian cover running along a wall at the toe drain of the Peruvannamuzhi Dam.

References 

Nyctibatrachus
Endemic fauna of the Western Ghats
Frogs of India
Taxa named by Neelesh Dahanukar
Amphibians described in 2017